Enrique Regüeiferos (15 July 1948 – 20 June 2002) was a boxer from Cuba. He was born in Havana, Cuba. He competed for Cuba in the 1968 Summer Olympics held in Mexico City, Mexico in the light welterweight event where he finished in second place.

References

External links

1948 births
2002 deaths
Boxers from Havana
Boxers at the 1967 Pan American Games
Boxers at the 1971 Pan American Games
Pan American Games gold medalists for Cuba
Olympic boxers of Cuba
Olympic silver medalists for Cuba
Boxers at the 1968 Summer Olympics
Boxers at the 1972 Summer Olympics
Olympic medalists in boxing
Medalists at the 1968 Summer Olympics
Cuban male boxers
Pan American Games medalists in boxing
Lightweight boxers
Medalists at the 1967 Pan American Games
Medalists at the 1971 Pan American Games
20th-century Cuban people